Presidential elections were held in Chile on 18 October 1891. Carried out through a system of electors, they resulted in the election of Jorge Montt (the sole candidate) as President.

Results

References

Chile
President
1891 10
1891 Chile